The Dibner Institute for the History of Science and Technology (1992–2006) was a research institute established at MIT, and housed in a renovated building (E56) on campus at 38 Memorial Drive, overlooking the Charles River.

Description
At the heart of the Institute was the Burndy Library on the ground floor, initially containing 37,000 volumes on the history of science and technology  collected by the Dibner Fund.  The Library also possessed a large collection of antique scientific instruments, such as astrolabes, telescopes, microscopes, early spectrometers, and a Wimshurst machine, which were on public display in a dedicated gallery outside the library.  Also on display was a large collection of antique incandescent light bulbs, gas discharge tubes, electronic vacuum tubes, and other early examples of electrical and electronic technology.  The Library would mount occasional special exhibits, such as The Afterlife of Immortality: Obelisks Outside Egypt.

The building was a modest Art Deco structure, fronting on Memorial Drive and the Charles River. Above the Library and display space, on the second and third floor were offices and lecture and seminar rooms.  The Institute held regular lectures, seminars, study programs, and an annual symposium in the history of science and technology.  Over the period of its existence, the Institute supported over 340 short- and longer-term fellowships.

History and development  
The Institute was named in honor of Bern Dibner (1897–1988), who had conceived of it before his death. The Institute was developed and supported by the Dibner Fund he had established in 1957, directed by his son David Dibner. The institute, from its inception, was run by executive director Evelyn Simha. On the academic side, the Institute was supported by a consortium of MIT, Boston University, Brandeis University and Harvard University.

In 1995, the 600-volume Babson Collection of historical material related to Isaac Newton was placed on permanent deposit with the Burndy Library.  The collection had been assembled by Roger Babson, founder of Babson College in Wellesley, Massachusetts, and was previously housed at the College. In 1999, the addition of the 7,000-volume Volterra Collection from Italy increased the Burndy Library collection by more than a third.

In 2004 MIT decided not to renew its affiliation, and the Dibner family began looking for a new location to house the collection.  David Dibner died unexpectedly in 2005.   The Dibner Institute closed in 2006, and the Burndy Library and associated collections were transferred to The Huntington Library in San Marino, California, which now offers a Dibner History of Science Program to fund fellowships, a lecture series and annual conference. The acquisition of the Burndy Library (by then numbering 67,000 volumes) transformed the Huntington Library's collections in the history of science and technology into one of the world's largest in that field.

The Huntington houses a permanent exhibition, Beautiful Science: Ideas that Changed the World, in the  Dibner Hall of the History of Science that displays approximately 150 books, manuscripts, photographs and objects from both the Burndy Library and the Huntington's non-Burndy holdings in the history of science and medicine.   Approximately 200 antique light bulbs from the Burndy Collection are on display in the Beautiful Science exhibition. The light bulbs are not available for reference or research use, except by special arrangement. The status and accessibility of the Burndy collection of gas tubes, vacuum tubes, and electronic artifacts is not clear from the Huntington website.

The Dibner Institute's former building was demolished in early 2007 to make way for new buildings for the MIT Sloan School of Management. The Dibner name remains at MIT, in the endowed Frances and David Dibner Professorship of the History of Engineering and Manufacturing.

See also 
Wikipedia:Portraits from the Dibner Library of the History of Science and Technology

References

External links 
 Legacy stub page at MIT
 Dibner Institute website as of August 31, 2006.  Archived by the Internet Archive.
 Dibner Institute Studies in the History of Science and Technology, MIT Press

Massachusetts Institute of Technology
Organizations established in 1992
2006 disestablishments in Massachusetts
Research institutes in Massachusetts
History of science
History of technology